Likavka is a village and municipality in Ružomberok District in the Žilina Region of northern Slovakia.

History

In historical records the village was first mentioned in 1315.

Geography
The municipality lies at an altitude of 520 metres and covers an area of 18.261 km². It has a population of about 3032 people.

External links
http://www.likavka.sk/ Official homepage
https://web.archive.org/web/20070513023228/http://www.statistics.sk/mosmis/eng/run.html

Villages and municipalities in Ružomberok District